Fechin can refer to

 Féchín of Fore (7th century), an Irish saint

 Nicolai Fechin (1881–1955), a Russian-American painter